Podoceridae is a family of amphipods. It contains eight genera:
Cyrtophium Dana, 1852
Laetmatophilus Bruzelius, 1859
Leipsuropus Stebbing, 1899
Neoxenodice Schellenberg, 1926
Parunciola Chevreux, 1911
Podobothrus Barnard & Clark, 1985
Podocerus Leach, 1814
Xenodice Boeck, 1871

References

Corophiidea
Crustacean families